The Cleburne County Courthouse is located at Courthouse Square in the center of Heber Springs, the county seat of Cleburne County, Arkansas.  It is a two-story brick building, built in the Jeffersonian Revival style in 1914 to a design by Clyde A. Ferrell.  It has a symmetrical facade, with slightly projecting wings on either side of a central entrance.  The entrance is fronted by a projecting four-column Classical portico with gabled pediment.  The building is topped by a large octagonal cupola.

The building was listed in the National Register of Historic Places in 1976.

See also
National Register of Historic Places listings in Cleburne County, Arkansas

References

Courthouses on the National Register of Historic Places in Arkansas
Government buildings completed in 1914
County courthouses in Arkansas
National Register of Historic Places in Cleburne County, Arkansas
Historic district contributing properties in Arkansas
Jeffersonian Revival architecture